Barend Wijnveld (13 August 1820 – 18 February 1902) was a Dutch painter.

Biography
He was born in Amsterdam and was a member of Arti et Amicitiae from 1854. From 1869 he was professor of the Rijksakademie van Beeldende Kunsten where he had many pupils. He was also artist-in-residence at Natura Artis Magistra.

He died in Haarlem.

References

Barend Wijnveld on Artnet

1820 births
1902 deaths
19th-century Dutch painters
Dutch male painters
Painters from Amsterdam
19th-century male artists
19th-century Dutch male artists